Home (also known as #Home),  is an Indian Malayalam-language drama film directed and written by Rojin Thomas. The film stars Indrans, Sreenath Bhasi, Naslen K. Gafoor, Deepa Thomas, Manju Pillai, Johny Antony and Kainakary Thankaraj . The film was released on Amazon Prime Video on 19 August 2021. This film received widespread critical attention. The story, background score, cinematography, social relevance, characterization and performances of the lead cast especially that of Indrans and Manju Pillai were critically acclaimed.

Plot 

The plot revolves around a middle-class family consisting of Oliver Twist, Kuttiyamma, Antony, Charles, and Appachan. It's a film that serves as a mirror for today's generation in a world full of technology.The story revolves around a technologically challenged father and his tech-savvy sons.

Cast

Music 
Rahul Subrahmanian is the music director of the movie. He has composed four songs for the film and also did the background scores for the movie.

Release
The film was released on Amazon Prime Video on 19 August 2021.

Reception 

The Times of India rated 3.5 out of 5 and wrote, "The movie is a must watch entertainer that the whole family can laugh and cry happy tears all through together". The Free Press Journal said that thoughtfully written and directed by Rojin Thomas, Home is a film representing the present times when emotions get only expressed on digital mediums, forgetting or avoiding personal contacts. Hindustan Times commented that sometimes too sweets but most times heartwarming, Rojin Thomas brings to life a lovely family drama that is driven by Indrans' effortless performance. Firstpost rated 3 on 5 for the movie and wrote, "Parts of #Home feel stretched, and the film could have done with some scissoring, but when it works, it works so well that this complaint recedes into the background in the face of its overall endearing nature and loveable simplicity."

References

External links 
 

2021 films
2020s Malayalam-language films
Indian family films
Indian drama films
Films shot in Kerala
Films shot in Kochi
Films not released in theaters due to the COVID-19 pandemic
Amazon Prime Video original films